Princess Kezia Rukidi of Toro (1906–1998), later The Queen of Toro, was the wife of King George Rukidi III of Toro (1904–1965). As Batebe (Queen-Sister), she served as the king’s chief advisor from 1965–1998.
She was the mother of Princess Elizabeth of Toro. She later became known as the Queen Mother Kezia Byanjeru Rukidi Abwooli.

1906 births
1998 deaths
Kezia, Princess of Buganda
Kezia, Queen of Buganda